Rory O'Moore (c. 1600–1655) was a leader of the 1641 Rebellion.

Rory O'Moore may refer to:
Rory O'More (died 1578), Irish rebel
Rory O'Moore, namesake of the O'Moore Medal
Rory O'More Bridge, a road bridge spanning the River Liffey in Dublin, Ireland 
Rory O'More (film), a 1911 American silent film